COVID-19 vaccination in mainland China is an ongoing immunization campaign against severe acute respiratory syndrome coronavirus 2 (SARS-CoV-2) in mainland China, in response to the ongoing pandemic in the region.

As of July 2022, it is estimated that about 89.7% of the country's population has received a vaccine, and about 56% of the population has received a booster dose.



Administration 
In June 2020, the Sinopharm BIBP vaccine (BBIBP-CorV) was authorized for emergency use in China. On July 22, Chinese authorities started the emergency use of COVID-19 vaccines.

On December 15, 2020, the COVID-19 vaccination for people under high risk started in China. On December 19, 2020, the National Health Commission (NHC) said that there has been 1 million doses of COVID-19 vaccine administered in China as of the day, and no serious adverse reactions were observed.

On December 31, 2020, NHC announced that the Sinopharm BIBP vaccine has been approved through the conditional marketing authorization process, and more than 3 million doses of COVID-19 vaccine has been administered in China. At the same time, NHC declares that COVID-19 vaccination is free to Chinese citizens.

On January 27, 2021, NHC said that the vaccination is being carried out in order, and there has been 22.767 million doses of COVID-19 vaccine administered in China as of January 26.

On March 1, 2021, Zhong Nanshan said that the vaccination rate of COVID-19 vaccine in China was currently 3.56%, and the Chinese Center for Disease Control and Prevention hoped the rate reach 40% by the end of June 2021.

Since late March 2021, the authorities has accelerated the promotion of free COVID-19 vaccination for the whole population. On March 22, 2021, Sun Chunlan, the Vice Premier of the State Council, stated that COVID-19 vaccination in China should be accelerated and the vaccination rate should be increased. On March 24, 2021, NHC announced that the number doses of COVID-19 vaccine administered will be daily reported on its website and social media account since that day. On March 29, 2021, NHC released the first version of the COVID-19 Vaccine Technology Guide.

On April 21, 2021, NHC stated that more than 200 million doses of COVID-19 vaccine has been administered in China, and 80% of doctors and nurses has been vaccinated.

On May 14, 2021, NHC restated that the COVID-19 administration progress should be accelerated due to the proportion of mutated SARS-CoV-2 and the re-appearance of local cases.

On June 19, 2021, NHC announced that more than 1.01489 billion doses of COVID-19 vaccine has been administered in China.

While public authorities have mandated lockdowns and mandatory mass testing for areas with infection, there has not been any rule to making vaccination mandatory. Some facilities within China have made vaccination mandatory for entry, including things like movie theatres, fitness centres, internet bars, museums and libraries.

In July 2022, according to official figures, while 89% had received 2 doses, only 56% of eligible people had received a booster dose. Furthermore, this was even lower among vulnerable elderly age groups, with only 19.7% of people over the age of 80 having received a booster dose. According to BBC reporting, this may have been attributed to public confidence in the ability of authorities to control outbreaks, the narrative presented by public authorities within China that the virus was mainly an overseas problem as well as some doctors within China who warned vulnerable people of the health risks of the vaccine.

Vaccines 
As of November 21, 2022, seven vaccines have been approved in mainland China through conditional marketing authorization or emergency use authorization.

In 2021 Nature reported that "studies have questioned the length of protection" that domestic vaccines such as CoronaVac and Sinopharm offer, especially when compared to mRNA vaccines. A 2022 meta-analysis found about 65% vaccine effectiveness against infection for CoronoVac, compared with about 90% for Pfizer and 98% for Moderna. Some analysts have criticized China's reluctance to import mRNA vaccines.

The Pfizer–BioNTech COVID-19 vaccine, agented by Fosun Pharma in mainland China, is waiting for approval.

See also 
 COVID-19 vaccines
 COVID-19 pandemic in mainland China

References 
 Daily reports on COVID-19 vaccination

 News and Articles

External links 
 Prevention and Control of COVID-19 > Vaccination Progress - National Health Commission 

China
vaccination